Frouwke Laning-Boersema (5 July 1937 – 10 January 2014) was a Dutch politician. She was a member of the House of Representatives from 1982 to 1994 for the Christian Democratic Appeal.

Early life 
Laning-Boersema was born on 5 July 1937 in Groningen, Netherlands. She studied medicine at the University of Groningen between 1955 and 1960 and specialised as a general practitioner at the same university between 1961 and 1963. Afterwards she started working as a GP on the island of Vlieland, working there for two years. She continued her work as a GP in Den Helder between 1965 and 1983.

Career 
Laning-Boersema was a member of the party council for the Christian Democratic Appeal between 1977 and 1982. She was a member of the House of Representatives from 1982 to 1994. Within her party she was the spokesperson for public health. Laning-Boersema was a nuclear pacifist and voted against party lines on the issue of nuclear armament.

Personal life 
In 1963, Laning married, adding her spouse's surname, Boersema, to her own. She was made a Knight of the Order of the Netherlands Lion on 28 April 1995.

References

1937 births
2014 deaths
Politicians from Groningen (city)
University of Groningen alumni
Dutch general practitioners
Christian Democratic Appeal politicians
Members of the House of Representatives (Netherlands)
Knights of the Order of the Netherlands Lion